Gerald Joseph Atwell (16 January 1917 – 20 April 1944) was an Australian RAAF pilot whose plane failed to return from a bombing raid over Italy in WWII. He had been a top-grade rugby league footballer who played in the New South Wales Rugby League for North Sydney.

Early life and rugby career
Atwell was born on 16 January 1917 in Campsie to Henry and Mary Atwell. He appeared twice for North Sydney in 1940. He worked as a hairdresser.

Personal life and military career
Atwell enlisted in the Royal Australian Air Force on 24 May 1941 in Sydney during WWII. He trained as a pilot and was assigned as such on 30 May 1942, sailing to England in August of that year. Pilot Officer Atwell was attached to No. 614 Squadron RAF in early 1944, flying Handley Page Halifax bombers from Celone Airfield. On 20 April, Atwell took off in Halifax JF108 to conduct a bombing mission against marshalling yards at Mestre. The aircraft assigned to the mission were recalled after the weather deteriorated, but JF108 did not arrive back at base and was considered lost. The bodies of three crew members were recovered; however, Atwell and the other crewmen have never been found. He is commemorated on the Malta Memorial.

Career statistics

See also
List of people who disappeared mysteriously at sea

References

1917 births
1940s missing person cases
1944 deaths
Australian hairdressers
Australian military personnel killed in World War II
Australian rugby league players
Australian World War II pilots
Missing in action of World War II
North Sydney Bears players
People lost at sea
Royal Australian Air Force officers
Royal Australian Air Force personnel of World War II
Rugby league players from Campsie, New South Wales